Peter Austin, (18 July 1921 – 1 January 2014) was a British brewer. He founded Ringwood Brewery and was a co-founder and first chairman of the Society of Independent Brewers (SIBA). He built some 140 new breweries in the UK and 16 other countries.

Early life and education
Peter Austin was born in Edmonton, London on 18 July 1921.  He went to Highgate School, followed by the British merchant navy training ship HMS Conway. His father worked for the brewing equipment supplier Pontifex, and his great-uncle had run a brewery in Christchurch.

Career
Austin founded Ringwood Brewery in 1978. In 1979, David Bruce started his first Firkin Brewery brewpub in Elephant and Castle, London; Austin oversaw his choice of equipment and the design for its small basement brewery.

Austin was the prime mover in establishing the Society of Independent Brewers (SIBA) in 1980, and its first chairman. Under his leadership, SIBA campaigned for 20 years, without the support of any other body, for a progressive beer duty system (smaller breweries to pay less tax on their products) to be introduced in the UK. Such a system was finally adopted by the then Chancellor Gordon Brown in 2002.

By the time that Austin had retired from Ringwood Brewery, he had assisted in helping start 40 new UK breweries in a decade.  After that, he worked internationally, in the US, France, China, Nigeria, and Russia, among others, building some 140 new breweries in 17 countries.

In the US alone, 74 new breweries were built, all using his brewing system. He taught Alan Pugsley brewing, and he went on to found Shipyard Brewing Company in 1994, and later take over Sea Dog Brewing Company.

Personal life
Austin married twice. He was predeceased by both wives, Joan and Zena, and his son Henry. He was survived by his other four children, Roland, Jane, Jeremy and Sarah.

References

1921 births
2014 deaths
People from Edmonton, London
People educated at Highgate School
English brewers
Businesspeople from London
20th-century English businesspeople